Cattle Town is a 1952 American Western film directed by Noel M. Smith and written by Thomas W. Blackburn. The film stars Dennis Morgan, Philip Carey, Amanda Blake, Rita Moreno, Paul Picerni and Ray Teal. The film was released by Warner Bros. on September 6, 1952.

Plot

Mike McGann is sent by a government official in Texas to help rich rancher Judd Hastings get squatters off his land. When he arrives, he realizes Hastings is actually running everyone out of the region and illegally seizing their cattle.

After coming to rancher Ben Curran's rescue, Mike vows to help others get their property back. Marian Hastings begins to realize that her father is in the wrong, particularly after learning he plans a stampede to disrupt Mike and the others. Thrown from her horse and knocked unconscious, Marian is in grave danger. Hastings tries to save his daughter and is killed. She and Mike decide to run the Hastings ranch together.

Cast 
Dennis Morgan as Mike McGann
Philip Carey as Ben Curran
Amanda Blake as Marian Hastings
Rita Moreno as Queli
Paul Picerni as Pepe
Ray Teal as Judd Hastings
Jay Novello as Felipe Rojas
George O'Hanlon as Shiloh
Robert J. Wilke as Keeno 
Sheb Wooley as Miller
Charles Meredith as Texas Governor
Merv Griffin as Joe

References

External links 
 

1952 films
Warner Bros. films
American Western (genre) films
1952 Western (genre) films
Films directed by Noel M. Smith
Films scored by William Lava
American black-and-white films
1950s English-language films
1950s American films